Cretaaviculus is an extinct genus of birds from the Upper Cretaceous Bostobe Formation of Kazakhstan. The type species, C. sarysuensis, is known only from an isolated of isolated, asymmetrical contour feather.

References

Bird genera
Fossil taxa described in 1969
Late Cretaceous birds of Asia